Damus is a surname. Notable people with the surname include:

Mike Damus (born 1979), American actor
Ronaldo Damus (born 1999), Haitian footballer

See also
Damus–Kaye–Stansel procedure, cardiovascular surgical procedure
Siege of Al-Dāmūs, battle of the Reconquista